Qadamgah (also Romanized as Qadamgāh; also known as Kadamga) is a village in Qarah Kahriz Rural District, Qarah Kahriz District, Shazand County, Markazi Province, Iran. At the 2006 census, its population was 2,012, in 592 families.

References 

Populated places in Shazand County